One-eyed jack is a playing card in a standard deck of cards.

One-eyed jack may also refer to:
 One-Eyed Jacks, a 1961 Western film directed by Marlon Brando
 Alone in the Dark: One-Eyed Jack's Revenge, the 1993 sequel to the video game Alone in the Dark
 One Eyed Jacks (Twin Peaks), a brothel on the show Twin Peaks
 One-Eyed Jack (band), a jam band from Rutherford, NJ
 One Eyed Jacks (album), a 1984 album by Spear of Destiny
 One-Eyed Jack (album), a 1978 album by Garland Jeffreys
 One-Eyed Jack, a 1970s British comic strip
 "One-Eyed Jack," an unidentified murder victim discovered in Tok, Alaska
 One-Eyed Jacks, a 1991 anthology in the Wild Cards series edited by George R. R. Martin
 One-Eyed Jack, leader of the alien Bounty Hunters working for Damocles and the Sword in the Gen¹³ comics and the Fire from Heaven crossover.
 Egg in the basket, an egg fried in a hole in a slice of bread